Dr. Muhammad Shahidullah Hall is one of the three founding residential halls of the University of Dhaka. Established in 1921 as Lyton Hall it was subsequently renamed Dhaka Hall and renamed again for the famous linguist Dr. Muhammad Shahidullah following his death in 1969.

It is located behind Curzon Hall and has a main building accommodation with two extensions. Only science faculty students are accommodated here.

Dr. Shahidullah is buried within the grounds.

Layout and facilities
The three-story main building was founded in 1921 with two later five-story additions (extension-1 or Ex-1 and  extension-2 or Ex-2). Other buildings include provost office, library, student's reading rooms, canteens, mess, mosque, and accommodation for teachers, officers and clerks.

There is a large play ground and a pond inside the complex and shops supplying daily necessities.

This hall has played an important role in the student politics of Bangladesh.

Gallery

References 

Buildings and structures in Dhaka
University and college residential buildings
University of Dhaka halls of residence